"Mirror Mirror" is a 1996 song recorded by Swedish-Norwegian Eurodance group Solid Base, released as the third single from their debut album, Finally (1996). Performed by lead vocalist Isabelle Heitman, who also co-wrote the lyrics, and rapper Thomas Nordin (aka Teo T.), it was a huge hit in Norway, peaking at number six and spending a total of 11 weeks within VG-lista. But it topped the radio chart Ti i skuddet in April 1996. The single sold to gold. The accompanying music video was made by Norwegian broadcaster NRK and filmed in Frognerparken in Oslo.

Track listing
 CD maxi, Sweden
"Mirror Mirror" (Radio Mix) – 3:19
"Mirror Mirror" (Dancefloor Dunka Dunka Mix) – 4:28
"Mirror Mirror" (Birch & Chris Club Mix) – 5:27
"Mirror Mirror" (Snipers Remix) – 5:05

Charts

References

 

1996 singles
1996 songs
Solid Base songs
English-language Norwegian songs